Bulldagger may refer to:

 A slang term used for a lesbian; see Dyke (slang).
 The Bulldaggers, a fictional rock band in Matt Howarth's comics.